Kim Ji-hyeok, better known by his online alias birdring, is a South Korean professional Overwatch player who played for several teams in the Overwatch League (OWL). He is best known for playing hitscan damage heroes, such as the sniper Widowmaker and highly-mobile Tracer. Prior to the OWL's inception, he played for KongDoo Uncia, KongDoo Panthera, and Cloud9 KongDoo. Kim signed with the London Spitfire of the OWL in the league's inaugural season wherein he was selected to play in the All-Star Game and won the league's first Grand Finals, after the Spitfire defeated the Philadelphia Fusion. After two seasons with the Spitfire, Kim signed with the Los Angeles Gladiators. After two seasons with the Gladiators, Kim retired from professional Overwatch. He came out of retirement a year later and joined the Boston Uprising.

Early life
According to Kim in an interview, he dropped out of high school to pursue a career as a professional gamer.

Professional career
Prior to competing in Overwatch, Kim spent his time trying to become a professional League of Legends player. After reaching the rank of Challenger, a rank given to the top 200 players in a given region, in both Japan and China, Kim received several offers from teams in both countries. However, since he was only 17 years old at the time, he could not compete in any official matches. After deciding to wait to join a team until he was old enough, Kim began playing Overwatch. Kim joined an amateurs Overwatch team, and later that year, he was signed by KongDoo Company.

Early career
Kim competed with team KongDoo Uncia in the inaugural season of OGN Overwatch APEX series, a premier Overwatch tournament series in South Korea. The team advanced to the semifinals of the tournament, where they were defeated by the eventual champions Team EnVyUs. In Season 2 of APEX, Kim and the team reached the quarterfinals before being defeated by Lunatic-Hai.

Prior to the beginning of Season 3, Kim was moved to KongDoo Panthera, another team ran by KongDoo Company. "I felt liberated after the move," Kim said, "On Uncia, I always played with a slight burden. As one of the cornerstones of the team, I felt as if I could never [afford to] mess up. It was a weight on my chest. But on Panthera, there's less pressure; I can rely on other great players like Rascal and Fissure to [share] the load." Panthera reached the semifinals of Season 3, where they faced Team EnVyUs. In the match, Kim played as the damage hero Tracer in what Young Jae Jeon of ESPN described as "out one of the best big-match Tracer performances of all time." Panthera swept EnVyUs 4–0 to advance to the Grand Finals against Lunatic-Hai. Despite a "brilliant" performance on Tracer by Kim, Panthera lost to Lunatic-Hai, thanks in part to better coordination and performance by Lunatic-Hai's support players.

In September 2017, Cloud9 acquired KongDoo Panthera and rebranded the team to Cloud9 KongDoo. The team competed in Season 4 of APEX and reached the semifinals before falling to team GC Busan. In the third place match against NC Foxes, Kim, playing as Tracer, struggled early in the match. After rebounding from his early issues, he and the team went on to sweep NC Foxes 4–0.

London Spitfire 
In late 2017, Kim signed with Cloud9's Overwatch League team London Spitfire for the league's upcoming inaugural season. Throughout Stage 1 of the season, Kim, while playing as the sniper hero Widowmaker, eliminated 2.42 opponents for every 1 of his own deaths. The team found early success, reaching the Stage 1 Finals. In as 3–2 win over the New York Excelsior in the finals, Kim, playing as damage hero McCree, had the highest first kill percentage among all players in the Stage 1 Playoffs at 28%. Kim suffered a wrist injury in Stage 3, causing him to miss three weeks of the stage. With a 24–16 regular season record, the Spitfire entered the season playoffs as the fifth seed. Kim was selected as a reserve for the 2018 All-Star Game, a game that took place at the end of the season; however, he sat out of the game due to a wrist injury.

Their first best-of-three series was against the Los Angeles Gladiators; the Gladiators won the first match, while the Spitfire won the second, leading to a third, and final, match. In the first map of match three, Kim, playing as the damage hero Hanzo, sealed the victory for the Spitfire, using Hanzo's ultimate ability Dragonstrike to kill three of the Gladiators as time expired. In map two, Kim, as Widowmaker, began the fight with a kill on Gladiators' damage player Lane "Surefour" Roberts, which became routine throughout the map, as the Spitfire won that map as well. London won the third map as well to defeat the Gladiators and advance to the semifinals. In the semifinals, the Spitfire faced the Los Angeles Valiant. London took the series with 3–1 and 3–0 wins, advancing them to the Grand Finals, where they faced the Philadelphia Fusion. In the first map of match one, Kim, playing as Widowmaker, was picked off by Fusion damage player Lee "Carpe" Jae-hyeok, who also was playing as Widowmaker, near the end of the round, ultimately giving Philadelphia the map win. However, the Spitfire went on to win the match 3–1 and won the second match 3–0, giving Kim and the team their first OWL title.

Through the first three stages of the 2019 season, the most prominent team composition, known as the meta, in the OWL consisted of running three tank heroes and three support heroes in which keeping tanks alive and sustaining over long periods of time were the highest priority. As a damage player, Kim transitioned playing other roles, such as the support hero Brigitte, and at times, Baptiste. Through the first stage of the season, Kim ranked 24th in damage dealt per 10 minutes, as the Spitfire struggles throughout the stage. After the first three stages of the season, the Spitfire were in sixth place in the regular season standings. In the final quarter of the season, the league implemented an enforced 2-2-2 role lock, where teams must use a team composition of two damage, two tank, and two support heroes, allowing Kim to return to playing damage heroes. The team finished the regular season in seventh place with a 16–12 record, advancing them to the play-in tournament. With a bye into the final round of the play-ins, the Spitfire faced the Shanghai Dragons; Kim struggled at times during the match, but ultimately, the team won and advanced to the season playoffs. In the playoffs, London fell to the New York Excelsior in the first round, sending them to the lower bracket of the double-elimination tournament. A loss to the San Francisco Shock in the first round of the lower bracket ended the Spitfire's playoff run. In October 2019, Kim parted ways with the Spitfire.

As a member of the inaugural season champions, the Spitfire retired Kim's number 20 jersey on January 15, 2020.

Los Angeles Gladiators 
In November 2019, Kim was signed by the Los Angeles Gladiators. In the knockouts of the May Melee, the first of three midseason tournaments of the season, Kim played a multitude of damage heroes, such as Sombra, Tracer, and Reaper; the Gladiators defeated the Washington Justice in the first round but fell to the Philadelphia Fusion in the quarterfinals. In the final midseason tournament of the season, the Countdown Cup, the Gladiators faced the Toronto Defiant in the first round of the knockouts. In the final map of the match, Kim played as Junkrat and achieved a "Fleta deadlift", a statistic named after Kim "Fleta" Byung-sun that occurs when one player accounts over half of their team's eliminations, as the Gladiators won 3–2. Los Angeles lost to the Philadelphia Fusion the following match. The Gladiators finished the regular season with the sixth seed in North America and advanced to the play-in tournament. The team defeated the Toronto Defiant in the play-ins to advance to the season playoffs; after the match Kim collapsed during the live OWL broadcast. Los Angeles Gladiators' director of operations Brenda Suh said that Kim experienced dizziness from dehydration and orthostatic hypotension. Despite the collapse, Kim played the following day in the first round of the double-elimination North America bracket against the Fusion; Los Angeles lost the match 0–3. A 0–3 loss against the Florida Mayhem the following day ended the Gladiators' season.

Kim and the Gladiators won the 2021 Countdown Cup, one of four midseason tournaments of the 2021 Overwatch League season. After the end of the 2021 playoffs, Kim announced his retirement.

Boston Uprising
After one year, Kim came out of retirement and joined the Boston Uprising prior to the 2023 season.

References

External links
Career statistics and player information from the Overwatch League.

South Korean esports players
Living people
London Spitfire players
Los Angeles Gladiators players
Boston Uprising players
Year of birth missing (living people)